Judith Diankoléla-Missengué (born 12 February 1968) is a Congolese sprinter. She competed in the women's 100 metres at the 1988 Summer Olympics.

References

External links
 

1968 births
Living people
Athletes (track and field) at the 1988 Summer Olympics
Republic of the Congo female sprinters
Olympic athletes of the Republic of the Congo
World Athletics Championships athletes for the Republic of the Congo
Place of birth missing (living people)
Olympic female sprinters